Subhash Chandra Singh (born 1960) is a social activist, people leader and policy maker from the State of Odisha, India. He is the first directly elected Mayor of Cuttack Municipal Corporation and member of Rajya Sabha from Odisha from Biju Janata Dal. He is the acting Treasurer of the party and has also served as National spokesperson for BJD. He was elected for Rajya Sabha on 24 March 2020. Being one of the most trusted senior leaders in BJD, he holds the position of Party Treasurer of Biju Janta Dal since 2016.

Prior to being elected to Rajya Sabha, he has served as Chairman of OB&OCWWB (Odisha Building & Other construction workers Welfare Board) for two consecutive terms.

He is also a founder member and general secretary of Biju Shramik Shamukhya ( Trade union wing of Biju Janta Dal). Biju Sramika Samukhya is currently the biggest trade union in Odisha. 

He is one of the most active members of Rajya Sabha from Odisha. He voices issues faced by common working class in the parliament like minimum wage for Aanganwadi and ASHA  workers, welfare schemes for drivers etc.

Early life 
Singh was born in a small village of Kendrapada (Father Lt.Damodar Singh and Mother Lt.Anusaya Singh). He started as a people leader and has been instrumental in creation of multiple workers union and welfare initiatives. He was the president of Cuttack Bancho Committee, an all party initiate created in 2006, which has played a key role in the development of  Cuttack.

From 1990 to 2012, he was the face of the communist movement in Odisha. Due to incompetent leadership and internal disputes within CPIM, he joined BJD (Biju Janta Dal) in July 2013.  At the time CPIM was directly supporting BJD government in Odisha.  BJD Chief and Odisha CM Sri Naveen Patnaik personally welcomed Mr.Singh  to Biju Janta Dal and said "He is a asset for the Party".

Right after joining BJD, Mr.Singh became the state spokesperson for BJD and has been vocal about various developmental schemes by the government ever since. In 2014, he was selected as the Chairman of OB&OCWWB (Odisha Building & Other construction workers Welfare Board). Under his leadership the labor welfare  board (OB&OCWWB) enrolled over 28 Lakhs workers and dispersed direct benefits to 20 Lakhs+ workers. His performance was not only recognized by the state and central government but also International Labor Organisation.

He continued to advise the state government on various welfare schemes including Jaga Mission, which guarantees permanent settlement for slum dwellers in Odisha. This is one of kind scheme by Odisha Government. This led to his huge popularity among the working class across Odisha. Meanwhile, with his performance record and loyalty towards the party, BJD Chief Shree Naveen Pattnaik appointed him as Party Treasurer for Biju Janta Dal.

In 2018 Subhash Singh under the leadership of honorable Chief minister Sri Naveen Pattnaik founded Biju Sramika Samukhya - the labour wing of BJD. Within 3 years BSS turned into the biggest and the most active trade union in Odisha.

Member of Parliament Rajya Sabha 
In March 2020, Mr.Singh was elected to Rajya Sabha as Member of Parliament. He has been one of the most active MPs from Odisha, known for raising grassroot level issues in the upper house. Some of the issues raised by Mr.Singh are as follows.

Points Related To Cuttack 

 Demanded development Naraj as the second railway station for Cuttack.
 Demand for more trains to stop-over at Cuttack, connecting the city to major metros across India.
 Re-development of Barabati Fort by ASI 
 Drainage system around NH5 to be improved and City exit points for Cuttack to be beautified by NHAI

Points Raised for the Working Class 

 Increase in minimum wage for Aanganwadi workers
 Proving social security to AASHA workers, giving special status and Increasing their minimum wage to INR 18,000.
 Removing GST on Kendu products from 18% to 5%. This will benefit around 10 Lakhs workers.  
 Creation for refreshment centers and resting places for commercial drivers on Highways by NHAI 
 Train connectivity from Kendrapada to Paradeep for workers travelling daily between both districts.

Other Points 

 Achieved UGC grant for Balangir Rajendra College post multiple demands at Rajya Sabha and follow ups with Ministry of Education
 Demanded GI tag for Rasabali, a delicious dessert from Kendrapada district.

Apart from raising issues in the upperhouse (Rajya Sabha), Mr.Singh also actively pursues the solutions by constantly chasing respective ministries.  This is the reason within few years he has become quite popular across party lines.

Cuttack Municipal Election 2022 - First Directly elected Mayor of Cuttack 

In 2022, BJD vote share in the Barbati-Cuttack assembly segment had plummeted to 34.7 percent in 2019 from 45.8 percent in 2014 and 53.8 percent in 2009, when in contrast the vote share of Congress went up from 28.4 percent in 2009 to 34.4 percent in 2014 and 37.6 percent in 2019. The top leadership in the party was on the lookout for a new face. In such scheme of things, CM Patnaik pitted sitting Rajya Sabha member Subhash Singh in the direct mayor election. The Mayor poll results show that BJD's Subash Singh polled a whopping 1.13 lakh votes in the three constituencies, becoming the first directly elected Mayor of Cuttack.

The BJD polled the highest of around 57633 votes in the 2014 Assembly elections, however, it nosedived to 46,417 in 2019 Assembly polls. On the other hand, Subhash Singh has polled over 80,000 votes in the Barbati-Cuttack segment. The winner shield for BJD shows that Congress polled almost around 50,000-52,000 votes in the Assembly segment. The incumbent legislator of Barbati-Cuttack Mojammad Mouqim of the Indian National Congress had polled 50,244 votes in the 2019 assembly polls. Commanding the maximum number of votes not only in Cuttack Barabati but also in Cuttack Sadar and Choudwar, Mr.Singh has proved himself to be the most popular leader in the whole Cuttack district.

Unions and Labour Forums
He is quite popular among young people and poor people. Apart from being in a front line leader in Biju Janta Dal, he is also a distinguished labour leader and is part of multiple unions and labor forums across India. This includes Auto Mahasangh, All India Hawkers Association, All Odisha Drivers Mahasangh, AASHA, Anganwadi, Swachya Sathi and multiple other unions.

References

1960 births
Living people
Rajya Sabha members from Odisha
Biju Janata Dal politicians
People from Kendrapara district